Brisa or Briza may refer to:

People
Brisa Roché, American singer-songwriter

Companies and brands
 Brisa - Auto-estradas de Portugal S.A., a Portuguese company that manages several highway systems
 Brisa drink, a soft drink produced in Madeira, Portugal by Empresa de Cervejas da Madeira
 Brisa, a Sabancı Group company in Turkey, the official producer and distributor of Bridgestone tyres from Japan
 Kia Brisa, a car built by Kia Motors, based in the Mazda Famillia
Dodge Brisa, a Venezuelan car model produced by the MMC Automoritz S.A.
Gruta Brisa Azul, a cave in the Azores.

Winds
 Brisa, a north-easterly wind which blows on the coast of South America or an east wind which blows on Puerto Rico during the trade wind season
 Brisa, the north-easterly monsoon in the Philippines

Plant
 Briza, a genus of grasses, native to northern temperate regions

See also
 Breeze (disambiguation)
Las Brisas Observatory
Brisas Hotels and Resorts
Cerro Quiabuc-Las Brisas Natural Reserve